Marofototra is a town and commune in Madagascar. It belongs to the district of Mananjary, which is a part of Vatovavy-Fitovinany Region. The population of the commune was estimated to be approximately 15,000 in the 2001 commune census.

Primary and junior level secondary education is available in town. 98% of the commune's population is engaged in farming.  The most important crops are cassava and rice, while other important agricultural products are peanuts and coffee. Services provide employment for 2% of the population.

References and notes 

Populated places in Vatovavy-Fitovinany